Saint-Ennemond is a commune in the Allier department in Auvergne-Rhône-Alpes in central France. The village is located on the border of the Nièvre department, bordered by the villages Lucenay-lès-Aix and Dornes. The town is named after Saint Ennemond, bishop of Lyon in the 6th century.  During the revolutionary period(1792-1795), the town took the name of Labron. The mayor is Jean-Claude Lefebvre.

The coat of arms of the municipality is a Coupé au 1) Vert with the Golden Boar, 2nd) party Gules a chevron and silver bell mouths.

Population

See also

Communes of the Allier department

References

Communes of Allier
Allier communes articles needing translation from French Wikipedia